Eric Brown (born September 7, 1964) is a former American football wide receiver in the National Football League. He played for the Kansas City Chiefs. He played college football for the Tulsa Golden Hurricane.

References

1964 births
Living people
American football wide receivers
Kansas City Chiefs players
Tulsa Golden Hurricane football players
National Football League replacement players